The 2009 Morocco Tennis Tour – Rabat was a professional tennis tournament played on outdoor red clay courts. It was part of the 2009 ATP Challenger Tour. It took place in Rabat, Morocco between 9 and 15 March 2009.

Singles main draw entrants

Seeds

Rankings are as of March 2, 2009.

Other entrants
The following players received wildcards into the singles main draw:
  Reda El Amrani
  Anas Fattar
  Yassine Idmbarek
  Mehdi Ziadi

The following players received entry from the qualifying draw:
 Alberto Brizzi
 Iñigo Cervantes-Huegun
 Carles Poch-Gradin
 Jan Hájek

Champions

Men's singles

 Laurent Recouderc def.  Santiago Ventura, 6–0, 6–2

Men's doubles

 Rubén Ramírez Hidalgo /  Santiago Ventura def.  Michael Kohlmann /  Philipp Marx, 6–4, 7–6(5)

External links
Morocco Tennis Tour official website

Rabat
2009
2009 Morocco Tennis Tour